"Invisible Touch" is the title track and first single from the 1986 album of the same name by the English rock band Genesis. The song is a group composition which featured lyrics written by drummer and singer Phil Collins.

It was their first and only No. 1 single in the United States; the song additionally spent three consecutive weeks at the top of the Billboard Hot 100 Airplay chart during summer 1986 until it was surpassed by Peter Cetera's "Glory of Love". The song was the first of five consecutive U.S. top five singles from the album of the same name. It also reached No. 4 in Canada and No. 15 in the United Kingdom. Its B-side is the second part of "Domino", titled "The Last Domino".

Collins has called it his "favourite Genesis song" and bassist/guitarist Mike Rutherford has called it "a wonderful song: upbeat, fun to play, always a strong moment in any gig". As the band's only Billboard Hot 100 number one, the song is included in Rock Song Index: The 7500 Most Important Songs for the Rock and Roll Era. In 2017, ShortList's Dave Fawbert listed the song as containing "one of the greatest key changes in music history".

History

"Invisible Touch" came about during a jam session, Rutherford playing a guitar riff while Collins improvised the line "She seems to have an invisible touch". Collins has said he heard the influence of Prince and Sheila E. in the drum machine and his lyrics were inspired by a few people he had known who had got under his skin. Despite liking the song himself, and despite the band's previous success, he has claimed he wasn't certain the song would be a hit. Collins said that "large chunks" of the lyrics are about his first wife Andrea Bertorelli, with whom he married from 1975 to 1980.

Cash Box called the song a "hook-laden pop workout."  Billboard called it "uptempo dance-pop with a clear Collins signature." In mid-1986, "Invisible Touch" was succeeded in the No. 1 position on the Billboard Hot 100 by "Sledgehammer", performed by Genesis' former lead singer, Peter Gabriel. Collins later jested about the occurrence in a 2014 interview, stating, "I read recently that Peter Gabriel knocked us off the No. 1 spot with 'Sledgehammer'. We weren't aware of that at the time. If we had been, we'd probably have sent him a telegram saying: 'Congratulations – bastard.'" The single also reached No. 1 on the U.S. Mainstream Rock Tracks chart.

Live versions
A live version of "Invisible Touch" appears on the albums The Way We Walk, Volume One: The Shorts, and Live over Europe 2007, as well as on the DVDs Genesis Live at Wembley Stadium, The Way We Walk – Live in Concert and When in Rome 2007.

"Invisible Touch" was performed during the Invisible Touch, We Can't Dance, Calling All Stations (with Ray Wilson on vocals), Turn It On Again and The Last Domino? tours. During the Turn It On Again tour, the song was the main set finale featuring fireworks going off as the song ended. It was also the set closer on The Last Domino? Tour, but there weren't any fireworks. Collins has also performed the song on his solo tours since its release, including The First Final Farewell and Not Dead Yet tours.

Genesis also performed the song at Wembley Stadium for Live Earth. Collins's use of the word "fuck" in the song (which he had done since 1992) in front of millions of television viewers at 2pm resulted in an apology from British presenter Jonathan Ross, who vowed to give Collins a "talking to". Collins was one of several performers at the event whose offensive language caused the BBC to be censured by the media regulator Ofcom.

The song has never been performed in its original key in concert. On the Invisible Touch and We Can't Dance tours, the song was tuned down a half-step to prevent strain on Collins' voice. On the Calling All Stations tour, it was tuned down further to fit then-lead vocalist Ray Wilson's naturally deeper voice. Starting with the Turn It On Again tour, the song was gradually tuned down further with each succeeding tour to accommodate Collins' aging voice, including the Not Dead Yet and The Last Domino? tours.

Music video
Genesis reunited with director Jim Yukich to make the "Invisible Touch" music video in 1986. Yukich had previously worked with Genesis on the "That's All" music video in 1983. The scene begins in a large auditorium with Collins, Rutherford and Banks goofing around with 8MM cameras; the video progresses to show the entire set with Collins using his own drumsticks for a microphone and the band fooling around with Yukich and the crew.

Personnel
 Phil Collins – vocals, Oberheim DMX, Simmons SDS 8
 Tony Banks – keyboards
 Mike Rutherford – electric guitar, bass guitar

Charts

Weekly charts

Year-end charts

Certifications

Live single

In 1992, "Invisible Touch" was recorded live during Genesis's 1991–1992 We Can't Dance world tour and released on limited edition 7-inch and CD near the end of the tour. Both formats were numbered and came with a booklet; the CD was housed in a box and the vinyl edition in a gatefold sleeve.

The A-side is the same version found on the accompanying live album The Way We Walk, Volume One: The Shorts. The B-sides "Abacab" and "The Brazilian" were culled from the filmed (and later released) Wembley Stadium gig from the 1987 Invisible Touch tour.

The 7-inch features an edited version of "Abacab," while the CD included complete versions of both songs.

Like the albums The Shorts and The Way We Walk, Volume Two: The Longs, and the home video The Way We Walk – Live in Concert, the title of the record was prefixed by "Genesis Live", with "(Live)" appearing as a suffix on the back sleeve and on the disc itself.

Unlike the original recording of the song, this live version was a top 10 hit in the UK, reaching number seven. In one of the interview sections on the Way We Walk – Live in Concert DVD, Collins jokes about re-releasing the song until it finally becomes a hit. It became their final single to reach the UK top 10.

Personnel
 Phil Collins – vocals
 Tony Banks – synthesizers
 Mike Rutherford – electric guitar
 Daryl Stuermer – bass
 Chester Thompson – drums

References

Sources

External links
 

Genesis (band) songs
1986 singles
1986 songs
1992 singles
Atlantic Records singles
Billboard Hot 100 number-one singles
Cashbox number-one singles
Charisma Records singles
Dance-rock songs
Song recordings produced by Hugh Padgham
Songs written by Phil Collins
Songs written by Mike Rutherford
Songs written by Tony Banks (musician)
Vertigo Records singles
Virgin Records singles